Kalmar Bloodbath may refer to:

 Kalmar Bloodbath (1505)
 Kalmar Bloodbath (1599)